Rotebro IS FF is a Swedish football club located in the northern Stockholm suburb of Rotebro, Sollentuna Municipality

Background
Since their foundation Rotebro IS FF has participated mainly in the lower divisions of the Swedish football league system.  The club currently plays in Division 2 Norra Svealand which is the fourth tier of Swedish football. They play their home matches at the Skinnaråsens IP in Sollentuna.

Rotebro IS are affiliated to the Stockholms Fotbollförbund.

Season to season

External links
 Rotebro IS FF – Official Website

Footnotes

Football clubs in Stockholm
Association football clubs established in 1918
1918 establishments in Sweden